The 2006 Northern Arizona Lumberjacks football team was an American football team that represented Northern Arizona University (NAU) as a member of the Big Sky Conference (Big Sky) during the 2006 NCAA Division I FCS football season. In their ninth year under head coach Jerome Souers, the Lumberjacks compiled a 6–5 record (5–3 against conference opponents), outscored opponents by a total of 378 to 296, and finished fourth out of nine teams in the Big Sky.

The team played its home games at the J. Lawrence Walkup Skydome, commonly known as the Walkup Skydome, in Flagstaff, Arizona.

Schedule

References

Northern Arizona
Northern Arizona Lumberjacks football seasons
Northern Arizona Lumberjacks football